Gilanmehr Fouman Football Club is an Iranian football club based in Fuman, Iran. They currently compete in 2016–17 Iran Football's 2nd Division.

They reached the Round of 16 in the 2016–17 Hazfi Cup.

Name history
Shahrdari Fouman (2007–2018)
Gilanmehr Fouman (2018–)

Season-by-season
The table below shows the achievements of the club in various competitions.

See also
 Iranian football league system

References

Football clubs in Iran
Association football clubs established in 2010
2010 establishments in Iran